The 1997–98 Marquette Golden Eagles men's basketball team represented the Marquette University in the 1997–98 season. The Golden Eagles finished the regular season with a record of 20—11, 8—8 in their conference. The Golden Eagles were led by fourth year Mike Deane and received an invitation to the NIT Tournament.

Roster

Schedule

|-
!colspan=9 style=| Conference USA Tournament

|-
!colspan=9 style= | NIT

External links
MUScoop's MUWiki

References 

Marquette Golden Eagles men's basketball seasons
Marquette
Marquette
Marquette
Marquette